The Tschingel (2,326 m) is a mountain of the Bernese Alps, overlooking Meiringen in the Bernese Oberland. It constitutes the eastern end of the Grindelgrat, a ridge descending from the Garzen summit (2,710 m).
The summit is on the border between Meiringen and Schattenhalb municipalities.

The toponym Tschingel or Zingel is comparatively frequent in Central Switzerland. It is a derivation of Latin cingulum "girdle, belt" and refers to a horizontal band of naked rock, or striations in a rock face.

References

External links
 Tschingel on Hikr

Mountains of the Alps
Mountains of Switzerland
Mountains of the canton of Bern
Two-thousanders of Switzerland
Meiringen